Alex Jürgen (born September 7, 1976) is an Austrian intersex activist. Jürgen was the first person in Austria to receive a birth certificate and passport with legal recognition of non-binary gender after having fought for it in court.

Life 
Alex Jürgen was born intersex in a hospital in Steyr and was assigned male at birth by the doctors. His parents gave him the name Jürgen. Two years later, doctors advised his parents to socialize him as a girl from then on because of an underdevelopment of his male sex characteristics. His first name was changed to Alexandra, through a medical intervention his penis and his inner testicles were removed.

Elisabeth Scharang shot a documentary film about him and his fight for recognition of intersexual people in Austria. The film was released in 2006 as Tintenfischalarm and had its premiere at the Berlin International Film Festival. Alex Jürgen was one of the first people in Austria to openly talk about their intersexuality and advocate for intersex rights.

In 2014, Jürgen founded the intersex rights organisation Verein intergeschlechtlicher Menschen Österreich (VIMÖ) and was an active member until 2018. Since then, he is an honorary member.

From 2016 on, together with the lawyer Helmut Graupner from the human rights organisation Rechtskomitee Lambda he issued a complaint at the Constitutional Court in order to get a non-binary sex entry in his passport and birth certificate. In June 2018, the Constitutional Court confirmed that a third option needs to be introduced, referring to article 8 of the European Convention on Human Rights.

References 

1976 births
Living people
Intersex non-binary people
Austrian LGBT rights activists
Intersex rights activists
Non-binary activists
21st-century LGBT people
Castrated people